Ruhudji Hydroelectric Power Station is a planned 358 megawatts hydroelectric power station in Tanzania. The lead developer of this renewable energy project is Tanzania Electric Supply Company Limited (TANESCO), the government-owned electricity utility company. TANESCO plans to develop the power station, as a public private partnership (PPP) project. Work is contemporaneously ongoing, along with the development of the 222 megawatts Rumakali Hydroelectric Power Station, also located in Njombe Region.

Location

Overview
The contract for a feasibility study and preparation of tender documents, worth US $6 million, was awarded to a consortium comprising the engineering firms Multiconsult of Norway, as the lead, Norplan Tanzania Limited and Tanzania Photomap Limited, as sub-contractors. Work includes feasibility studies for the two proposed hydropower dams and power stations, preparation of conceptual design and tender documents, and conduct of environmental and social impact assessment studies for the two power stations and associated evacuation transmission lines.

See also

 List of power stations in Tanzania
 Njombe Region
 Njombe District

References

External links
 Tanzania appoints contractors for Rumakali and Ruhudji hydropower projects As of 14 August 2021.

Power stations in Tanzania
Njombe Region
Hydroelectric power stations in Tanzania
Dams in Tanzania